Edward Burton George Wintle (3 January 1909 – 25 February 1972) was an Australian rules footballer who played with North Melbourne in the Victorian Football League (VFL).

Family
The son of Edward Burton Wintle (1876-1966), and Edith Wintle (1889-1942), née Jones, Edward Burton George Wintle was born at Collingwood, Victoria on 3 January 1909.

Football

Collingwood (VFL)
He played in at least 13 Second XVIII games for Collinwood over two seasons (1930-1931).<ref>[https://forever.collingwoodfc.com.au/reserves-players-r-z "Edward B. (Bert) Wintle", (Reserves/VFL Players R-Z, at "Collingwood Forever.]</ref>

North Melbourne (VFL)
On 28 April 1933 "E.V. Wintle" was granted a clearance from "Collingwood to North Melbourne".Club Notes, The Argus, (Wednesday, 3 May 1933), p.16.

In his one and only match for the North Melbourne First XVIII he plated on the half-back flank against St Kilda, at the Junction Oval, on 27 May 1933.The Teams: St. Kilda v. North Melbourne, The Age, (Friday, 26 May 1933), p.6.

Military service
He served in the Australian Army during World War II.

Death
He died at Heidelberg, Victoria on 25 February 1972.

 Notes 

References
 
 World War Two Nominal Roll: Sergeant Edward Burton Wintle (VX104543), Department of Veterans' Affairs.
 B883, VX104543: World War Two Service Record: Sergeant Edward Burton Wintle (VX104543), National Archives of Australia''.

External links 

1909 births
1972 deaths
Australian rules footballers from Victoria (Australia)
North Melbourne Football Club players